Lori Beth Denberg (born February 2, 1976) is an American actress and comedian. She is best known for her work as an original cast member of the Nickelodeon sketch comedy series All That and for her role as Lydia Liza Gutman on The WB sitcom The Steve Harvey Show.

Early life
Denberg was born February 2, 1976, in the Northridge section of Los Angeles, California.

Career
She began her career appearing on Nickelodeon's All That (from 1994 to 1998), after graduating from high school. At 18, she was the oldest cast member. the first three seasons of Figure It Out as a regular panelist (from 1997 to 1998), and then The WB's The Steve Harvey Show (from 1998 to 2002).

On Figure It Out, Denberg had a knack for guessing the correct answer just before the contestant could win the grand prize, often even before the end of the second round, as her questions and guesses were more serious and better thought out, as opposed to the sillier questions and guesses that other panelists (particularly Kevin Kopelow and Danny Tamberelli) would give.

She appeared in the 1997 film Good Burger with fellow All That castmates Josh Server, Kenan Thompson, and Kel Mitchell. She had a minor role in the film Dodgeball: A True Underdog Story in 2004, playing cheerleader Martha Johnstone. Denberg reunited with her All That cast members for the 2011 Comikaze Expo. She joked at the expo that she was now "living out her old age." She made a brief cameo in a 2012 episode of Workaholics as herself.

In February 2018, she joined fellow All That castmates for a semi-reunion on the MTV show Wild 'N Out, which aired the following month. She also appeared in an episode of Double Dare that pit Thompson against Mitchell to assist in the demonstration of physical challenges.

In December 2018, Denberg appeared in “Discontinued”, a special hosted by YouTube star Andre Meadows. The special looks at the rise and fall of the world's most famous discontinued foods, toys, customs, and businesses.

Denberg returned as a recurring guest star in the 2019 revival of All That, reprising her Loud Librarian role and "passing the torch" as the host of Vital Information to new cast member Reece Caddell. She also made a cameo appearance playing Uno in the independent film Ham on Rye in 2019.

She competes on the twenty-fourth season of Worst Cooks in America, the show's seventh celebrity edition titled Thats So 90s, airing in April and May 2022.

Filmography

Film

Television

References

External links

WedByLB Wedding Officiant Site

1976 births
Living people
20th-century American actresses
20th-century American comedians
21st-century American actresses
21st-century American comedians
Actresses from Los Angeles
American film actresses
American television actresses
American women comedians
Comedians from Los Angeles County
People from Northridge, Los Angeles